Saskylakh Airport  is a public use international airport in Saskylakh, Anabarsky District, in the Sakha Republic of Russia.

Airlines and destinations

References

Airports in the Arctic
Airports in the Sakha Republic